The 1992 Halloween Havoc was the fourth annual Halloween Havoc professional wrestling pay-per-view (PPV) event produced by World Championship Wrestling (WCW). It took place on October 25, 1992, from the Philadelphia Civic Center in Philadelphia, Pennsylvania in the United States — this was the second Halloween Havoc held at this venue after the inaugural event in 1989. In 2014, the event was made available on WWE's streaming service, the WWE Network.

Production 
Halloween Havoc was an annual professional wrestling pay-per-view event produced by World Championship Wrestling (WCW) since 1989. As the name implies, it was a Halloween-themed show held in October. The 1992 event was the fourth event in the Halloween Havoc chronology and it took place on October 25, 1992, from the Philadelphia Civic Center in Philadelphia, Pennsylvania. This was the second Halloween Havoc held at this venue after the inaugural 1989 event.

The event featured professional wrestling matches that involve different wrestlers from pre-existing scripted feuds and storylines. Professional wrestlers portray villains, heroes, or less distinguishable characters in the scripted events that build tension and culminate in a wrestling match or series of matches.

Event

The opening bout was a tag team match pitting Erik Watts and Van Hammer against the Vegas Connection (Diamond Dallas Page and Vinnie Vegas). The match was won by Hammer and Watts. This was a dark match that did not air on the pay-per-view broadcast.

The second bout was a six man tag team match in which Johnny Gunn, Shane Douglas, and Tom Zenk defeated Arn Anderson, Michael Hayes, and Bobby Eaton. The match ended when Zenk delivered a superkick to Hayes and then Gunn gave him a Thesz Press, enabling Gunn to pin Hayes. Although Douglas, Gunn, and Zenk were the faces going into the match, they were vigorously booed by the Philadelphia audience, resulting in Douglas and Gunn working as heels.

The third bout was a singles match between Brian Pillman and Ricky Steamboat. The match ended when Steamboat attempted to perform a sunset flip, but Pillman was able to reverse it and attempted to roll-up Steamboat. Steamboat was in turn able to reverse this and pin Pillman.

The fourth bout was no disqualification match in which Big Van Vader defended the WCW United States Heavyweight Championship against Nikita Koloff on behalf of Rick Rude (Rude, the incumbent champion, had complained about having to wrestle twice). Rude, Harley Race, and Madusa were barred from ringside. The match saw Vader squash Koloff; it ended when Koloff missed a Russian Sickle (lariat), enabling Vader to deliver a powerbomb to Koloff and pin him. During the bout, Koloff sustained a herniated disc in his neck from a stiff clothesline from Vader, leading him to retire.

The fifth bout was a tag team match in which Barry Windham and Dustin Rhodes - who held both the NWA World Tag Team Championship and the WCW World Tag Team Championship - defended both sets of titles against Steve Austin and Steve Williams. The match was originally scheduled to be Steve Williams and Terry Gordy defending against the Steiner Brothers, but this was changed after Rick Steiner suffered a torn chest muscle during a Japanese tour, resulting in Rhodes and Windham winning the titles from Gordy and Williams on the October 3, 1992 episode of WCW Saturday Night. Gordy and Williams then challenged Rhodes and Windham to a rematch for the titles, with Austin substituting for Gordy after he no-showed the event. Austin and Williams originally thought they had won the match after Austin pinned Windham, however as Windham was not the legal man in the match, the original referee, Randy Anderson, overturned the decision of referee Nick Patrick and restarted the match. The match subsequently ended in a time limit draw after 30 minutes.

The sixth bout was a singles match in which NWA World Heavyweight Champion Masahiro Chono defended his title against Rick Rude. Both competitors were able to choose their own guest referee for the match, with Chono chosing Kensuke Sasaki and Rude chosing Harley Race. Prior to the match, Ole Anderson flipped a coin which determined that Race would be inside the ring while Sasaki would be outside. The match ended when Chono was disqualified by Race for throwing Rude over the top rope, enabling him to retain the title despite losing the match.

The seventh bout was a singles match in which WCW World Heavyweight Champion Ron Simmons defended his title against The Barbarian. The match ended when Simmons powerslammed The Barbarian and then pinned him.

The main event was a coal miner's glove match between Jake Roberts and Sting. The match stipulation was chosen using the "Spin the Wheel, Make the Deal" concept, in which a legit spin of a wheel of fortune earlier in the evening was used to determine the match type. The potential options were:

 Barbed wire match
 Cage match
 Coal miner's glove match
 Dog collar match
 First blood match
 "I quit" match
 Lumberjacks with belts match
 Prince of Darkness match
 Russian chain match
 Texas bullrope match
 Texas death match
 Spinner's choice

The match ended when Sting retrieved the coal miner's glove and struck Roberts with it, causing a snake Roberts was holding to turn on him and bite him in the face. This allowed Sting to pin Roberts.

Results

References

External links 
 

1992 in Pennsylvania
1992 World Championship Wrestling pay-per-view events
Events in Philadelphia
Halloween Havoc
Holidays themed professional wrestling events
October 1992 events in the United States
Professional wrestling in Philadelphia